Andre Hall (born September 3, 1982) is an American actor and model. He is best known for his role as Keri Lewis in the Toni Braxton Bio-pic and as Danny Harris in the Tyler Perry sitcom Love Thy Neighbor.

Early years
Hall was born and raised in Indianapolis, Indiana, and moved to Los Angeles, California in 2008 to pursue his career dreams. He was a model for many campaign advertisements including UGGS Australia, Nike and Bose.

Career
In 2013, Hall was announced as one of the cast members of Tyler Perry's new sitcom, Love Thy Neighbor.
In 2015 Hall was cast in Toni Braxton: Unbreak My Heart and to be released in 2016 on Lifetime.

Filmography

References

External links
 

Living people
American male television actors
21st-century American male actors
Male models from Indiana
Place of birth missing (living people)
Male actors from Indianapolis
Male actors from Los Angeles
1982 births